William "Clipper" Flynn (April 29, 1849 – November 5, 1881) was an American professional baseball player who played in the National Association as a first baseman for the 1871 Troy Haymakers and the 1872 Washington Olympics.

External links

1849 births
1881 deaths
19th-century baseball players
Major League Baseball first basemen
Troy Haymakers (NABBP) players
Chicago White Stockings (NABBP) players
Troy Haymakers players
Washington Olympics players
Troy Haymakers (minor league) players
Baseball players from New York (state)
People from Lansingburgh, New York